The Roots School System (RSS) is a school system based in Rawalpindi, Pakistan.

History
The organization was founded in 1988 by Riffat Mushtaq with the first institution at Harley Street Rawalpindi. The organization has spread with her children operating separately in what Riffat describes as "healthy competition": Khadija Mushtaq being CEO of the Roots Ivy International University; Faisal CEO of Roots Millennium Schools; and Walid CEO of Roots International Schools.

 RSS was the only system in Pakistan that catered from ages two and over to undergraduate.

Alumni
 Ali Moeen Nawazish, academic and columnist at the Jang Group

See also
 Beaconhouse School System

References

External links
 

1988 establishments in Pakistan
School systems in Pakistan